Mount Sterling, often written as Mt. Sterling, is a home rule-class city in Montgomery County, Kentucky. The population was 6,895 at the time of the 2010 U.S. census. It is the county seat of Montgomery County and the principal city of the Mount Sterling micropolitan area.

History
Mount Sterling is named for an ancient burial mound called Little Mountain, and for the town of Stirling in Scotland. It was named by the first developer of the area, Hugh Forbes. The Kentucky Assembly passed an act in 1792 establishing the town as Mt. Sterling, a misspelling which was retained.

The area was originally part of the thick wilderness of central Kentucky. Explorers, hunters, and surveyors traveling along a trail called Old Harper's Trace noted a 125-foot-high tree-covered mound which they called The Little Mountain. Later excavations showed it to be a burial site. The site of the mound is now the intersection of Queen and Locust Streets in Mt. Sterling.

The first cabin in the area was built in 1779. The first permanent settlement was established around 1790, when Forbes began to sell lots and laid out a road, now Locust Street. In 1796 the town was established as the county seat of newly created Montgomery County. At that time the town consisted of 33 town lots, four retail stores, and three taverns. A courthouse was built, the first of seven to be housed in Mt. Sterling. A jail and a town pump were also installed. A large brick market house where farm produce was bought and sold confirmed the town as the commercial center of the surrounding area. Baptist, Presbyterian and Methodist churches were established during the town's first decade.

During the Civil War the town was occupied alternately by Union and Confederate troops on multiple occasions. The Battle of Mt. Sterling in June 1864, which ended in a Confederate defeat, was the last of the fighting in Montgomery County.

Geography
Mt. Sterling is located at  (38.056613, -83.944500).

Demographics

As of the census of 2000, there were 5,876 people, 2,478 households, and 1,536 families residing in the city. The racial makeup of the city was 89.09% White, 8.73% African American, 0.22% Native American, 0.19% Asian, 0.75% from other races, and 1.02% from two or more races. Hispanic or Latino people of any race were 1.68% of the population.

There were 2,478 households, out of which 28.9% had children under the age of 18 living with them, 44.8% were married couples living together, 14.2% had a female householder with no husband present, and 38.0% were non-families. 33.3% of all households were made up of individuals, and 17.4% had someone living alone who was 65 years of age or older. The average household size was 2.28 and the average family size was 2.89.

In the city, the population was spread out, with 22.7% under the age of 18, 10.6% from 18 to 24, 28.4% from 25 to 44, 21.0% from 45 to 64, and 17.4% who were 65 years of age or older. The median age was 37 years. For every 100 females, there were 86.0 males. For every 100 females age 18 and over, there were 83.1 males.

The median income for a household in the city was $27,050, and the median income for a family was $54,074. Males had a median income of $30,584 versus $21,081 for females. The per capita income for the city was $17,585. About 17.1% of families and 19.4% of the population were below the poverty line, including 29.4% of those under age 18 and 17.8% of those age 65 or over.

Arts and culture
Beginning in the eighteenth century, Court Day quickly became the annual trading day for the area. It remains a big event today, held on the third Monday in October and the weekend prior. Approximately 130,000 people from all parts of the country gather for the four-day event that specializes in many different arts and crafts, food and music.

The Gateway Regional Arts Center holds classes and exhibitions in the former First United Methodist Church, a historic building listed on the National Register of Historic Places.

List of Registered Historical Places

 Bondurant House
 Chesapeake and Ohio Railroad Passenger and Baggage Depots
 Church of the Ascension
 Confederate Monument of Mt. Sterling
 East Mt. Sterling Historic District
 Enoch Smith House
 Gaitskill Mound Archeological Site
 John Bell Hood House
 KEAS Tabernacle Christian Methodist Episcopal Church
 Machpelah Cemetery
 Methodist Episcopal Church South
 Miss Emma Hicks Bungalow
 Monarch Milling Company
 Mt. Sterling Commercial District
 Northwest Residential District
 Ralph Morgan Stone House
 W. T. Fitzpatrick House
 William Chiles House
 Wright-Greene Mound Complex

Education
Mount Sterling has a lending library, a branch of the Montgomery County Public Library.

The city is served by Montgomery County Public Schools and is home to Montgomery County High School.

Climate
The climate in this area is characterized by hot, humid summers and generally mild to cool winters.  According to the Köppen Climate Classification system, Mt. Sterling has a humid subtropical climate, abbreviated "Cfa" on climate maps.

Notable people

 Lawrence Chenault (b. 1877), African American film actor
 Rep. Henry Daniel (1786–1873)
 Rep. Amos Davis (1794–1835)
 Ernie Fletcher (b. 1952), Governor of Kentucky (2003–2007)
 Nancy Green (1834–1923), the original Aunt Jemima 
 Robert E. Payne (b. 1941), United States District Judge
 Jeremy Sumpter (b. 1989), actor
 Jordan T. Gentry (b. 1989), actor famous for his portrayal of notable black actors Blackface
 James L. White (1947–2015), screenwriter known for Ray
 Josephine B. Sneed (1899–1986), Commissioner of Cook County, Illinois

References

External links
 
 

Cities in Kentucky
Cities in Montgomery County, Kentucky
County seats in Kentucky
Mount Sterling, Kentucky micropolitan area